In mathematics, a weak trace class operator  is a compact operator on a separable Hilbert space H with singular values the same order as the harmonic sequence.
When the dimension of H is infinite, the ideal of weak trace-class operators is strictly larger than the ideal of trace class operators, and has fundamentally different properties. The usual operator trace on the trace-class operators does not extend to the weak trace class. Instead the ideal of weak trace-class operators admits an infinite number of linearly independent quasi-continuous traces, and it is the smallest two-sided ideal for which all traces on it are singular traces.

Weak trace-class operators feature in the noncommutative geometry of French mathematician Alain Connes.

Definition 

A compact operator A on an infinite dimensional separable Hilbert space H is weak trace class if μ(n,A)  O(n−1), where μ(A) is the sequence of singular values.  In mathematical notation the two-sided ideal of all weak trace-class operators is denoted,

where  are the compact operators. The term weak trace-class, or weak-L1, is used because the operator ideal corresponds, in J. W. Calkin's correspondence between two-sided ideals of bounded linear operators and rearrangement invariant sequence spaces, to the weak-l1 sequence space.

Properties 

 the weak trace-class operators admit a quasi-norm defined by

making L1,∞ a quasi-Banach operator ideal, that is an ideal that is also a quasi-Banach space.

See also 

 Lp space
 Spectral triple
 Singular trace
 Dixmier trace

References 

 
 

 

Operator algebras
Hilbert space
Von Neumann algebras